The following teams took part in the Division I tournament, held from April 15, 2007 through April 21, 2007.  Group A was played in Qiqihar, China.  Group B was played in Ljubljana, Slovenia.

Group A

Standings 

France is promoted to Main Championship.
China is demoted to Division II.

Scoring leaders

Group B

Standings 

Slovenia is promoted to Main Championship.
Romania is demoted to Division II.

Scoring leaders

External links 
Group A at the IIHF
Group B at the IIHF

IIHF World Championship Division I
2
IIHF World Championship Division I
International ice hockey competitions hosted by China
World
2006
IIHF World Championship Division I
IIHF World Championship Division I
Sports competitions in Ljubljana
2000s in Ljubljana